"No Phone" is the name of the lead-off single from the alternative rock band Cake's fifth studio album, Pressure Chief. "No Phone" reached number 13 on the US Alternative chart.

According to AllMusic, the song "decries the encroachment of technology."

Track listing

Chart positions

References

2004 singles
Cake (band) songs
Songs about telephones
Songs written by John McCrea (musician)
Columbia Records singles
2004 songs
Calls